Glycymeris decussata, or the decussate bittersweet, is a species of bivalve mollusc in the family Glycymerididae. It can be found in Caribbean waters, ranging from Florida to the West Indies and Brazil.

References

decussata
Molluscs described in 1758
Taxa named by Carl Linnaeus